Hedley Norman Carr F.R.A.I.A., A.R.I.B.A. (21 March 1904 – 9 June 1966) was an Australian architect active in the mid 20th century as a partner of Hedley Carr Allen & Watts. His architectural archive is held by the State Library of New South Wales. A detailed biographical record of Carr's architectural career is held at the Australian Institute of Architects in Sydney.

Early life
Carr was born in Orange, New South Wales and spent his early years living in that town. His family were members of the Methodist Church. He grew up in the home built for his parents in 1899 Tyneside in Sale Street. Carr was one of six children of Frank Pattison Carr and Annie Maria (née Howard) and was educated locally at Orange Public School, Wolaroi Methodist Boys College and for his senior years as a boarding student at Newington College in Sydney. He graduated from the Department of Architecture at Sydney Technical College (STC) in 1928 having served his articles under Old Newingtonian architect Arthur Anderson. In his final year of study he was elected President of the Architectural Society at STC. Carr married in 1930, and then traveled to the United States, where he spent a further two years studying architecture. He was then employed on several large public building projects in Washington D.C. From North America he and his wife went on to England, Ireland and Europe.

RIBA Bronze Medal

In 1938 Carr was awarded the bronze medal of the Royal Institute of British Architects for the best building erected in London that year. His winning design was for a £180,000 block of flats. The building, Stocklelgh Hall, is in Prince Albert Road Regent's Park. It covered an area of 1 and a half acres and contains 60 flats in six blocks. Each block has its own entrance from a courtyard. The building is faced with soft-toned red brick with stone dressings and the entrance halls and all doors in the principal rooms are of Australian walnut.

Mosman houses
In 1939 after returning to Australia from six years working aboard Carr designed a family home Finedon in Ryrie Street, Mosman and much of its furniture. When the home was sold by the Carr family in 1983 it was photographed and some of the furniture was acquired by the Caroline Simpson Library & Research Collection of the Historic Houses Trust of New South Wales as representative of 1930s Sydney design. Also in 1939 Carr designed a house at 8 Beauty Point Road, Mosman. The three-storey home was on a steep site that fell from the street down towards the water's edge.

MARS
In 1939 Carr became a founding member of the Modern Architectural Research Society (MARS). MARS Group, was a British architectural think tank founded in 1933 by several prominent architects and architectural critics of the time involved in the British modernist movement.

Architectural career

In 1939 Carr designed a memorial church for the Berry family in Trundle, New South Wales to celebrate their arrival in that district in 1888. The brickwork of the then Methodist Church was red in an old English style. The body of the church is only 19 feet wide and the tower is over 30 feet high with a shallow-pitched roof, on a deformed octagon which is surrounded by a wrought iron finial. The roof is tiled to harmonise with the brick work, and the internal finishing is cement rendered above a dado height. This is coloured cream, in order to lighten the internal appearance. At the time of its construction the design was described as being Inter-War Medieval Gothic. In 1941 and 1947 Carr was on the jury of the Royal Australian Institute of Architects  Sulman Award. The Old Newingtonians’ Union panel of honorary architects, under Carr's convenership, was responsible for the post World War II development of Newington College including the building of the War Memorial Block, the Prescott Block, the  Science Block, the Nesbit Wing and the Centenary Hall. Throughout his career Carr worked for the Methodist Church as a communicant member of that Christian denomination. Not only did he design buildings for the Methodist schools that he was an Old Boy of but for parish churches as well.
Chatswood South Uniting Church, built in 1871, is the oldest surviving Methodist church north of Sydney Harbour. It is a picturesque Gothic style church designed by Thomas Rowe. In the era when Carr was articled to Arthur Anderson the sanctuary, two vestries and the pipe organ were added to that church. In 1937 the Chatswood South parsonage was designed by Carr.

References

1904 births
1966 deaths
New South Wales architects
Architects from Sydney
People educated at Newington College